This is a list of the municipalities in the province of Teruel in the autonomous community of Aragon, Spain. There are 236 municipalities in the province.

See also List of Aragonese comarcas.

See also

Geography of Spain
List of cities in Spain

 
Teruel